Sunny Bunnies (Polish: Słoneczne Zajączki) is a computer-animated children's television series produced by Digital Light Studio (for its first 6 seasons and part of the 7th) and Animation Café (season 7 onwards). The show consists of seven full seasons, with 26 episodes each. The seventh season was launched on February 17, 2022, and is airing on YouTube.
Sunny Bunnies is broadcast in more than 160 countries internationally, and its YouTube channel launched in April 2016 with management support from DHX-owned online kidsnet WildBrain.

Plot
The Sunny Bunnies are a group of magical bunnies that inhabit the sun. In each episode they appear in seemingly randomly chosen locations, ranging from the local park and various other places throughout the world, and on two separate occasions, beyond. During these endeavors, the characters are usually at odds with each other and clash, leaving a trail of chaos and destruction in their wake. As opposed to most other preschool-oriented shows, Sunny Bunnies heavily utilizes absurdist humor and slapstick to drive its comedy. At the end of every episode, a number of "bloopers" are featured, either showing something happening during the production of the episode or a clip from the episode itself. The series puts heavy focus on the characters, their personalities, their semi-dysfunctional relationship with one another, and their dynamics, like Turbo's straight man persona clashing heavily with Hopper's hyperactive and often foolish actions for example.

Characters

Main

 Turbo (the orange bunny, voiced by Dmitri Davidovich) is the overprotective, short-tempered and occasionally arrogant designated leader of the other bunnies. He is caring, intelligent, and self-confident, but a little bossy and controlling to his friends. He usually serves as the straight man to the madcap antics of the others, especially those generated by Hopper. He is 5 years old. 
 "Big" Boo (the pink bunny, voiced by Dmitri Davidovich) is 1 year old. He often takes care of the others. He is the largest bunny in the group, and loves ice cream, to the point that in some episodes, he's rarely seen without it. Sometimes he looks a little bit stupid, bit he's actually smart and kind.
 Iris (the purple bunny, voiced by Svetlana Tsimokhina) is one of the most intelligent bunnies. She has a younger sister named Shiny, and they tend to do everything together. She always wears a large pink bow (with white dots) and doesn't like when her bow gets lost or stolen. Iris understands magic and is 4 years old.
 Shiny (the light blue bunny, voiced by Svetlana Tsimokhina) is a kind-hearted and rather sensitive bunny. She always wears a flower in her hair. Shiny is sisters with Iris, and spends her time playing with her. She is 3 years old. She is the only bunny to have hair resembling that of a human.
 Hopper (the green bunny, voiced by Svetlana Tsimokhina)  is 1 year old. Despite his cute demeanor, he is the most mischievous, short-tempered, and impatient member, and most of the show's comedy is driven by his antics and the mayhem that he generates, especially early on. . Despite all of his seemingly antagonistic flaws, he does care for his friends, with his actions usually being playful as opposed to having full-out malicious intentions; he often does suffer the consequences in a spectacular fashion, either due to his friends catching wind and retaliating or his own plans backfiring comedically and often nonsensically.

Minor
 The Big Gray Wolf (voiced by Dmitri Davidovich) is the main antagonist of Season 2 and 3. Debuting in the episode of the same name, the wolf comes from the moon and formulates many plans to trap and eat the Bunnies, but always gets fooled or loses them, often accidentally.
 Robot S-Marty (voiced by Dmitri Davidovich) is a new resident in the Sunny Park debuting in Season 5. S-Marty is an orderly and punctual robot, who is keeping an eye on how tidy the park is.

Episodes

Series overview

Season 1 (2015)

Season 2 (2016–17)

Season 3 (2017–18) 
Note: Starting with Magic Eraser, all episodes would be first released on the official YouTube channel.

Season 4 (2018–19)

Season 5 (2020)

Season 6 (2021-2022)

Season 7 (2022-2023)

Video games

Sunny Bunnies: Magic Pop

In October 2018, it was announced that an official Sunny Bunnies video game was in development by video game company 9th Impact. On 16 November 2018, "Sunny Bunnies: Magic Pop!" was launched on the iOS App Store and Google Play Store. The game is a puzzle where players tap three or more adjoining of the same color in order to make them magically "pop" and count towards achievement of the level objective. An episode of the official Sunny Bunnies TV series was released on the same day to promote the game. In the episode, the bunnies discover a digital game on a computer and start playing. One of the bunnies, Boo, unwittingly knocks over the screen, crushing the others and somehow transporting them inside the game itself. After lifting up the computer, he discovers how to play the game and complete the objective to "pop" his friends out of the game and back into reality, thus restoring things to normal.

Sunny Bunnies: Coloring Book

In early 2021 another game, an app entitled "Sunny Bunnies: Coloring Book" was launched on Google Play Store and on 17 November 2022, an updated version was released. The app is said to be committed to creating a safe and educational environment for children: girls and boys of 2–6 years of age. The colorful images in the game are designed to enhance pattern recognition and develop creative problem solving skills. There are also rewards which included at many levels including coloring multiple pictures at day or over a number of days to allow prizes for all players.

FEATURES OF SUNNY BUNNIES: COLORING BOOK:
● Free to play.
● No advertising.
● Teacher approved in Play Store.
● Age restrictions: up to 12 years of age.
● Characters, multiple tasks, humor. 
● Each of the Sunny Bunnies wins their own prizes after coloring the specific number of images.
● Additional packs of various themes.
● Created for kids special: audio and vocabulary, ease of use, illustrations and animation.
● Encourages a love of learning.
● Pictures designed to enhance brain development and skills.
● A tutorial is available to help learn the necessary coloring skills.

References

External links
 
 
 
 Sunny Bunnies: Magic Pop! on Google Play Store
 Sunny Bunnies: Magic Pop! on App Store

2010s animated television series
2020s animated television series
Computer-animated television series
Animated characters
Animated preschool education television series
2010s preschool education television series
2020s preschool education television series
Disney Junior original programming
Family Jr. original programming
Animated television series about children
Animated television series about rabbits and hares
Television series about wolves
Animated television series without speech
Polish animated television series
Polish children's animated adventure television series
Polish children's animated comedy television series